Three Cornered Moon is a 1957 Australian television play starring James Condon.

Plot
The play is set on   the   Duke   of  Mall’s   yacht   at   Cannes  years ago. Lenora, the Duke's wife, leaves her philandering husband. The Duke seeks solace in Lenora's identical twin sister in Paris.

Cast
James Condon as the Duke of Mall
Margo Lee as the Duchess of Mall

Production
Costumes were done by Thelma Afford. Desmonde Dowling did the set design. The play was broadcast live in Sydney.

See also
List of live television plays broadcast on Australian Broadcasting Corporation (1950s)

References

External links

1950s Australian television plays
1957 television plays